"Coulda Been" is the third single from American Idol finalist, Kimberley Locke, from her One Love album. This is an enhanced disc which contains the music video for the single. Though originally plans were to release "You've Changed" as the third single in the USA while "Coulda Been" would be the third single in the UK, the label decided to release "Coulda Been" across the board. Although this was a fan favorite from the album, the single did not gain momentum on American pop radio stations and failed to chart, although it did become a minor hit in the UK. A dance remix by DJ Volume was released on iTunes and through a DJ service called Ultimix. A second remix by Joe Bermudez remains unreleased.

Tracks
 "Coulda Been"
 "Before"

Charts

Billboard review
Billboard reviewer Chuck Taylor stated: "Almost a year after the release of her debut hit, the delightfully poppy "8th World Wonder," Kimberley Locke demonstrates her versatility (and, we hope, staying power) with the smooth, slinky "Coulda Been," long a fan favorite from her "One Love" disc. This midtempo chugger, produced and co-written by the great Guy Roche, is an ideal antidote to the sameness that has made top 40 a two-trick rock and hip-hop pony: It has enough of an urban vibe to give it needed hipness, but it puts hook and melody at the top of the priority list, even tossing in a key change that is just plain fun; something you don't find in commercial music much anymore. Lyrically, Locke taunts a potential suitor who missed his chance with the divine talent: "Coulda been the one that hits my spot / But you're not and all you got is something that coulda been." Memorable song, masterful vocal and a great way to wipe away the winter doldrums. So good."

Music video
The video for "Coulda Been" was directed by Urban Strom, who has also directed videos for Mary J. Blige, Rachel Stevens and LeAnn Rimes. The video was filmed in London, England in the spring of 2004. In the video, Kimberley sees another woman's name show up on her boyfriend's caller ID. She goes on to tell him that one day he will look back at what "coulda been" and regret letting her go.

External links

References

2005 singles
Kimberley Locke songs
Songs written by Dan Muckala
2004 songs
Songs written by Kari Kimmel
Curb Records singles
London Records singles